Lithophane amanda, or Amanda's pinion, is a species of cutworm or dart moth in the family Noctuidae. It is found in North America.

The MONA or Hodges number for Lithophane amanda is 9891.

References

Further reading

 
 
 

amanda
Articles created by Qbugbot
Moths described in 1900